Lake Mitchell is one of two lakes in Wexford County, Michigan, that are joined together by the Clam Lake Canal. The other lake is Lake Cadillac.

Mitchell State Park is located on Lake Mitchell. Bluegill, Pumpkinseed Sunfish, Black Crappie, Rock Bass, Northern Pike, Walleye, Smallmouth Bass, Largemouth Bass, Bullhead are types of fish in Lake Mitchell.

History
Historically, Lake Mitchell was referred to as Big Clam Lake, and Clam Lake is still shown in the USGS official Geographic Names Information System as a variant name for Lake Mitchell.

In 1873, local businessman George A. Mitchell founded the village of Clam Lake (renamed Cadillac, Michigan, in 1882) and constructed the canal connecting Big Clam Lake to Little Clam Lake. At the time, the canal enabled logging on the west side of Lake Mitchell; logs floated through the canal entered Lake Cadillac, on the east shore of which stood lumber mills, the railroad and the Village of Clam Lake.

The names of the two lakes were changed in 1903, with Little Clam Lake renamed as Lake Cadillac (for the community) and Big Clam Lake as Lake Mitchell, in honor of William W. Mitchell, the nephew and business partner of George A. Mitchell.

See also
List of lakes in Michigan

References

Bodies of water of Wexford County, Michigan
Mitchell